Gornje Primišlje is a village in Croatia, under the Slunj township, in Karlovac County.

Notable natives and residents 
 Svetozar Livada (born 1928) - a philosopher, sociologist, historian, politician and demographer

References

Geography of Croatia
Populated places in Karlovac County